The Martian Sphinx is a science fiction novel by John Brunner, writing under the pen-name of Keith Woodcott. It was first published in the United States by Ace Books in 1965.

References

1965 British novels
1965 science fiction novels
Novels by John Brunner
Ace Books books
Novels set on Mars